Gadebridge Roman Villa, alternatively known as Gadebridge Park Roman Villa, is a ruined Roman villa in Hemel Hempstead, Hertfordshire, England.

Excavation
A chance discovery in 1962, it was excavated in 1963-68 under the direction of David S. Neal.  A second excavation took place in 2000, also under the direction of Dr Neal.

History
The site may have begun as a pre Roman farm, but after the Roman invasion of AD 43 its proximity to the Roman city of Verulamium seems to have precipitated its development into a sort of spa and resort. From the Antonine Period, c. 138 AD, stone buildings were added, and around 300 AD a large swimming pool, the biggest in Roman Britain after the one at Bath were built.

The site may have been leveled around  AD 350 possibly because of its owner's support for the   usurper emperor Magnentius. It returned to agricultural use and was used for cattle pens.

Conservation
The villa is situated in Gadebridge Park. Since the excavations the site has been scheduled and is under grassland.

Artefacts from the villa are held by the Dacorum Heritage Trust.

References

Sources
 Gadebridge Roman Villa Dacorum Heritage Trust, Accessed March 2012 
Gadebridge Roman Villa  St Albans Museums, Accessed March 2012
Neal, David S. (1974). The excavation of the Roman villa in Gadebridge Park, Hemel Hempstead, 1963-8 (Reports of the Research Committee of the Society of Antiquaries of London, 31)	
  
Discover how Dacorum's largest Roman villa evolved 'Our Dacorum', Herts Memories Network.  Accessed March 2012

Roman villas in Hertfordshire
Dacorum
Scheduled monuments in Hertfordshire
4th-century disestablishments in Roman Britain